Haugesund Mekaniske Verksted (HMV) was founded in 1900 as a shipyard in the city centre of Haugesund. The shipyard was moved to the western side of Risøy in 1912. From around 1970 the business has been towards the offshore market, with the construction of modules, maintenance of ships and oil and gas offshore installations.

Haugesund Mekaniske Verksted is the city's biggest employer and is owned by the service company Aibel.

Ships
Incomplete list

References

External links
 Aibel AS

Shipyards of Norway
Companies based in Haugesund
Manufacturing companies established in 1900
Norwegian companies established in 1900